Zip Bus Chup Raho was an Urdu weekly drama series which ran on Geo TV. It was a story of a woman named Parveen Un Nisa, who is the mother of Jibi and Taby. Her husband has mysteriously left her a few years back which led her to face many challenges as a single parent. This story unveils how society treats a woman once trapped, especially when a woman without her husband carrying responsibilities of their children. Retitled as Tumko Khamosh Rehna Hai, it also aired in India on Zee Zindagi.

Synopsis
"The story is the emotional and traumatic journey of Parveen un Nisa, a woman living in a post modernist society, where individuals are valued on the basis of their skills and their socio-economic achievements. She is not skilled or bright enough to live up to the expectations and demands of such societies. She has always been a housewife with a son and daughter who are very demanding. Her husband could not cope the needs and demands of life and escapes. Naïve Parveen does not know much about the dynamics of vicious social structure around her and starts getting exploited by a woman named Gypsy. Gypsy is basically the bad side of patriarchal system, a kind of a woman who serves men at the expense of exploiting women like Parveen and reinforcing the status quo. She transforms Parveen into Paro. Parveen has never been happy being Paro, the good woman inside her keeps asserting, nonetheless it is not easy to get out of such clutches. Will Parveen be able to break the shackles and set herself free? Or her family and her familial problems will continue bogging this woman down?"

This frustration and fear misleads her to trust women called Gypsy who claims to be a socialite, but in reality she exploit vulnerable women and trains them to become an object of rich business tycoon’s.

Here comes the twist, will Paro be able to hide who exactly she is? Or will she be getting a chance by a society to turn and established her identity back to Parveen and live a normal life with her children by refusing this grimy trade and live normally  like any other respectful women.

Cast
 Ayesha Khan as Parveenunissa (Parro)
 Sakina Sammo as Gypsy
 Humayun Saeed as Ozair/Omair
 Nauman Maqsood as Haseeb Durrani
 Asad Malik as Manzoor Hussain
 Mohib Mirza as Raij
 Annie Jaffry as Tabby
 Nazli Nasr as Munazzah (Manno)
 Babar Khan as Adnan
 Natasha Saleem as Lisa
 Ayesha Khan as Adan
 Mudassir Waqar as Sameer

References

External links
 http://pinoytvshowshd.net

Pakistani drama television series
Geo TV original programming